First-seeded Margaret duPont defeated Nelly Adamson 7–5, 6–2 in the final to win the women's singles tennis title at the 1949 French Championships.

Seeds
The seeded players are listed below. Margaret duPont is the champion; others show the round in which they were eliminated.

  Margaret duPont (champion)
  Louise Brough (third round)
  Nelly Adamson (finalist)
  Sheila Summers (semifinals)
  Betty Hilton (first round)
  Helen Rihbany (quarterfinals)
  Annalisa Bossi (semifinals)
  Jean Quertier (quarterfinals)
  Nel Hermsen (third round)
  Monique Hamelin (third round)
  Helena Straubeová (first round)
  Virginia Lee Boyer (first round)
  Jacqueline Patorni (third round)
  Joy Gannon (third round)
  Joan P. Curry (quarterfinals)
  Nicla Migliori (third round)

Draw

Key
 Q = Qualifier
 WC = Wild card
 LL = Lucky loser
 r = Retired

Finals

Earlier rounds

Section 1

Section 2

Section 3

Section 4

References

External links
   on the French Open website

1949 in women's tennis
1949
1949 in French women's sport
1949 in French tennis